Captura recomendada is a 1950 Argentine film.

Cast
 Julián Bourges		
 Pedro Buchardo		
 Margarita Corona		
 Elda Dessel	
 Lucio Deval	
 Gloria Ferrandiz		
 Carmen Giménez	 	
 Carlos Ginés		
 Julia Giusti		
 José Guisone		
 Ricardo Lavié		
 Onofre Lovero		
 Domingo Mania	 ...	 Doctor
 Marcelle Marcell		
 José Maurer

External links
 

1950 films
1950s Spanish-language films
Argentine black-and-white films
Argentine drama films
1950 drama films
1950s Argentine films